Xoán is Galician for John.

Notable people with the name include:

 Xoán Paredes (born in 1975), Galician geographer
 Xoán de Novoa (João da Nova), Spanish explorer, 1460–1509
  (born 1946), Spanish politician

See also
 João
 John (disambiguation)
 Juan
 Xohán de Cangas, a jograr or troubadour, around the thirteenth century
 San Xoán de Río, a municipality in Galicia (Spain)
 San Juan (disambiguation)
 São João (disambiguation)
 Alternate forms for the name John
 Xoana (disambiguation)

Galician masculine given names